Events in the year 1830 in Chile.

Incumbents
President: Francisco Ruiz-Tagle until April 1, José Tomás Ovalle
Vice President: José Tomás Ovalle until April 1

Events
April 1 - resignation of President Ruiz-Tagle
April 17 - Chilean Civil War of 1829–30: Battle of Lircay, decisive Pelucones (Conservative) victory

Births

 August 16 – Diego Barros Arana, historian (d. 1907)

Deaths
April 17 - Guillermo Tupper

See also
Chilean Civil War of 1829–30

References

 
1830s in Chile